The 1986 San Diego mayoral special election was held on June 3, 1986 to elect the mayor for San Diego. The special election was necessary due to the resignation of former Mayor Roger Hedgecock.

Municipal elections in California are officially non-partisan, though some candidates do receive funding and support from various political parties. The non-partisan special primary was held Tuesday, February 25, 1986. Former San Diego City Council member Maureen O'Connor and current council member Bill Cleator received the most votes and advanced to the June runoff. O'Connor was elected mayor with a majority of the votes in the June runoff.

Roger Hedgecock resignation
On December 10, 1985, Roger Hedgecock resigned as mayor of San Diego after losing an attempt to overturn a felony conviction on one count of conspiracy and 12 counts of perjury. Deputy Mayor Ed Struiksma assumed the role of acting mayor until a special election could be held to fill the vacancy.

Candidates
Maureen O'Connor, former member of the San Diego City Council and mayoral candidate in 1983
Bill Cleator, member of the San Diego City Council and mayoral candidate in 1983
Floyd Morrow, former member of the San Diego City Council
Ed Struiksma, member of the San Diego City Council and acting mayor
Mary Christian-Heising, political scientist 
Loch David Crane, magician, college instructor, and perennial candidate
Robert McCullough, environmental developer
Raymond Peters, former owner of New World Airways
John Kelley, semi-retired public relations man, and perennial candidate
Warren Nielsen, construction company owner
Vernon Watts, Jr., unemployed
Nicholas Walpert, part-time pilot
Rose Lynne, retired teacher and perennial candidate
Arthur Helliwell, veteran

Campaign
The special election to replace Hedgecock attracted a crowded field of candidates. The three candidates considered front-runners were San Diego City Council member Bill Cleator, a Republican, and former council members Maureen O'Connor and Floyd Morrow, both Democrats. Acting mayor Ed Struiksma initially filed to run for election, but dropped out of the race after learning that he would be subject of a criminal investigation related to allegedly fabricated expense accounts.

In the primary election held February 25, 1986, O'Connor placed first with 45.9 percent of the vote followed by Cleator with 30.1 percent. Morrow finished in third with 19.1 percent of the vote. Struiksma, whose name remained on the ballot despite dropping out, received 1.6 percent of the vote. The remaining votes were distributed between 12 other candidates, none of whom received more than one percent of the vote. As the top two vote-getters, O'Connor and Cleator advanced to the June runoff. O'Connor was then elected mayor with 55.3 percent of the vote on June 3, 1986.

Primary election results

Runoff election results

References

1986
1986 California elections
California special elections
1986 United States mayoral elections
United States mayoral special elections
1980s in San Diego
June 1986 events in the United States